"Wild One" is a dance single by Motown girl group Martha and the Vandellas. Written and produced by William "Mickey" Stevenson and Ivy Jo Hunter (two-thirds of the collaborators behind the group's most celebrated tune, "Dancing in the Street"). 
The song was another Top 40 triumph for the group as it reached #34 on Billboards Hot 100 singles chart and #11 on the Hot R&B singles chart. 
The backing track for 'Wild one' was an alternative version of the backing track to 'Dancing in the Street'.

"Wild One" suffered somewhat in sales as it was released just four months after the monster hit "Dancing In The Street". Many radio stations were still playing that record.

Background
The song, which in lead singer Martha Reeves' description, was a tribute to bikers (released shortly after The Shangri-Las' "Leader of the Pack"), described the narrator's strong love for her "wild one" who is told he's "no good" by the narrator's close circle. The narrator tells her "wild one" to not listen to what others say and continue to "sav(ing his) love for (her)".

Cash Boxsaid that the "storyline concerns a gal who digs a 'victim of circumstance'" and that the song has the "flavor of" the group's recent hit "Dancing in the Streets."

Personnel
Lead vocals by Martha Reeves
Background vocals by Rosalind Ashford, Betty Kelly, William "Mickey" Stevenson, and Ivy Jo Hunter
Written and produced by William "Mickey" Stevenson and Ivy Jo Hunter
Instrumentation by the Funk Brothers:
Benny Benjamin: drums
James Jamerson: bass guitar
Ivy Jo Hunter: percussion
Jack Ashford: tambourine, vibes
Robert White: guitar
Eddie Willis: guitar
Russ Conway: trumpet
Herbert Williams: trumpet
George Bohanon: trombone
Paul Riser: trombone
Henry Cosby: tenor saxophone
Mike Terry: baritone saxophone

Chart performance

References

1964 singles
Martha and the Vandellas songs
Songs written by William "Mickey" Stevenson
Songs written by Ivy Jo Hunter
Tamla Records singles
1964 songs
Song recordings produced by William "Mickey" Stevenson